Hans-Dieter Schmidt (born 9 January 1948) is a former German football player turned manager.

Playing career
Schmidt's playing career – part of which he spent with Hannover 96 – ended early after a severe injury at the age of 23.

Coaching career
Following the end of his playing days, Schmidt passed his manager diploma and worked as manager of SV Meppen for several years. After spending a year with Eintracht Nordhorn, Schmidt joined VfB Oldenburg as manager and came in second place in the German amateur football championship in 1988. In the same year, he joined FC Bayern Munich, managing their reserve team for two years, before taking over as managing director of Hannover 96. While working in that office in Hannover, he was interim manager for two matches, before Michael Lorkowski took over. He also managed VfB Lübeck and VfL Osnabrück, before Schmidt went abroad for the first time in 1994. He managed Egyptian top-flight team Baladeyet Al-Mahalla before joining Saudi Premier League side Al-Qadisiya Al Khubar. In 1996, he returned to Germany, taking over as managing director of 1. FC Magdeburg. In September 1996, he succeeded Karl Herdle as Magdeburg manager, a job he kept until 1999. With Magdeburg he won promotion to the then-third-tier Regionalliga. After he was sacked at 1. FC Magdeburg in the fall of 1999, Schmidt became a scout for Bundesliga side Hamburger SV Between 2003 and 2007, Schmidt went abroad again, managing teams in Iran (Persepolis F.C.), Ghana (King Faisal Babes, Asante Kotoko, All Blacks FC), Egypt (Ismaily SC) and South Africa (Black Leopards). Since the beginning of the 2008–09 season, Schmidt has been director of sports at sixth-tier side SC BW 94 Papenburg. After he was sacked in December 2009, Schmidt took on managing Ghana side Sekondi Eleven Wise who are fighting relegation from the Ghana Premier League

References

External links

1948 births
Living people
Footballers from Hanover
German footballers
Association football midfielders
Hannover 96 II players
German football managers
1. FC Magdeburg managers
Hannover 96 managers
FC Bayern Munich non-playing staff
Black Leopards F.C. managers
SV Meppen managers
VfB Oldenburg managers
FC Bayern Munich II managers
Persepolis F.C. non-playing staff
King Faisal Babes F.C. managers
Sekondi Eleven Wise F.C. managers
German expatriate footballers
German expatriate sportspeople in Egypt
Expatriate football managers in Egypt
German expatriate sportspeople in Ghana
Expatriate football managers in Ghana
German expatriate sportspeople in Iran
Expatriate football managers in Iran
German expatriate sportspeople in Saudi Arabia
Expatriate football managers in Saudi Arabia